V&V may refer to:

 verification and validation, in engineering and quality management systems
 software verification and validation
 Victor and Valentino,  animated television series

See also 

 IV&V
 VV (disambiguation)